Mary John Batten (née Fodchuk; August 30, 1921 – October 9, 2015) was a Canadian lawyer, judge and political figure in Saskatchewan. She represented Humboldt from 1956 to 1964 in the Legislative Assembly of Saskatchewan as a Liberal. She was the first woman of Ukrainian origin to be elected to a Canadian provincial parliament.

She was born Mary John Fodchuk in 1921 in Sifton, Manitoba and educated in Calder, Saskatchewan, Ituna and Regina and at the University of Saskatchewan. She articled with John Diefenbaker and was called to the Saskatchewan bar in 1945, later moving to Humboldt. She married M. Charles R. Batten, also a lawyer. After leaving politics in 1964, she was named to the Saskatchewan District Court. In 1983, she was named Chief Justice for the Court of Queen's Bench, becoming the first female chief justice for Saskatchewan. Batten retired from the bench in 1990. Batten died in October 2015 at the age of 94.

References 

1921 births
2015 deaths
Saskatchewan Liberal Party MLAs
Judges in Saskatchewan
Canadian people of Ukrainian descent
Women MLAs in Saskatchewan